The 1st European Athletics Championships were held in Turin, Italy, at the Stadio Benito Mussolini between 7 and 9 September 1934.  A contemporaneous report on the event was given in the Glasgow Herald.

Results
Medalists and complete results were published.

Track

Field

Medal table

Participation
According to an unofficial count, 223 athletes from 23 countries participated in the event, three athletes less than the official number as published.

 (13)
 (2)
 (7)
 (20)
 (18)
 (27)

 (17)

 (6)
 (3)
 (4)
 (8)
 (4)

 (1)
 (1)
 (18)
 (11)
 (4)

References

External links 
 European Athletics website

 
European Athletics Championships
European Athletics Championships
European Athletics Championships
1934 in European sport
International athletics competitions hosted by Italy
Sports competitions in Turin
1930s in Turin
September 1934 sports events